In mathematics and physics, a recurrent tensor, with respect to a connection  on a manifold M, is a tensor T for which there is a one-form ω on M such that

Examples

Parallel Tensors
An example for recurrent tensors are parallel tensors which are defined by 

with respect to some connection .

If we take a pseudo-Riemannian manifold  then the metric g  is a parallel and therefore recurrent tensor with respect to its Levi-Civita connection, which is defined via

and its property to be torsion-free.

Parallel vector fields are examples of recurrent tensors that find importance in mathematical research. For example, if  is a recurrent non-null vector field on a pseudo-Riemannian manifold satisfying

for some closed one-form , then X can be rescaled to a parallel vector field. In particular, non-parallel recurrent vector fields are null vector fields.

Metric space
Another example appears in connection with Weyl structures. Historically, Weyl structures emerged from the considerations of Hermann Weyl with regards to properties of parallel transport of vectors and their length. By demanding that a manifold have an affine parallel transport in such a way that the manifold is locally an affine space, it was shown that the induced connection had a vanishing torsion tensor
.
Additionally, he claimed that the manifold must have a particular parallel transport in which the ratio of two transported vectors is fixed. The corresponding connection  which induces such a parallel transport satisfies

for some one-form . As a result, Weyl called the resulting manifold  with affine connection  and recurrent metric  a metric space.

This induces a canonical map  on  defined by
,
where  is the conformal structure.  is called a Weyl structure, which more generally is defined as a map with property
.

Recurrent spacetime
One more example of a recurrent tensor is the curvature tensor  on a recurrent spacetime, for which
.

References

Literature

 A.G. Walker: On parallel fields of partially null vector spaces, The Quarterly Journal of Mathematics 1949, Oxford Univ. Press
 E.M. Patterson: On symmetric recurrent tensors of the second order, The Quarterly Journal of Mathematics 1950, Oxford Univ. Press
J.-C. Wong: Recurrent Tensors on a Linearly Connected Differentiable Manifold, Transactions of the American Mathematical Society 1961,
 G.B. Folland: Weyl Manifolds, Journal of Differential Geometry 1970

Riemannian geometry
Tensors